The 1939 PGA Championship was the 22nd PGA Championship, held July 9–15 at Pomonok Country Club in Queens, New York.  Then a match play championship, Henry Picard won his only PGA Championship, defeating Byron Nelson with a birdie at the 37th hole. It was the second of his two major titles; he won the Masters in 1938. Nelson won the U.S. Open three months earlier and the next PGA Championship in 1940. Beginning in 1939, he made five finals in six PGA Championships, and won his second title in 1945.

Picard had not trailed and led by two as late as the 26th hole, but the match was squared on the 29th green and Nelson led by one after 32 holes. They halved the par-3 35th at par and both had birdie putts on the 36th green. Nelson missed his from  feet while Picard sank his from three to square up the match. On the extra hole, both again had birdie putts: Picard made his from ten feet while Nelson missed his from six.

Defending champion Paul Runyan lost in the quarterfinals to Dick Metz.

This PGA Championship was held during the 1939 New York World's Fair. The golf course no longer exists; Pomonok Country Club disbanded in 1949 and the property was developed for residences.

Format
The match play format at the PGA Championship in 1939 called for 12 rounds (216 holes) in seven days:
 Sunday and Monday – 36-hole stroke play qualifier, 18 holes per day;
defending champion and top 63 professionals advanced to match play
 Tuesday – first two rounds, 18 holes each
 Wednesday – third round – 36 holes
 Thursday – quarterfinals – 36 holes
 Friday – semifinals – 36 holes
 Saturday – final – 36 holes

Past champions in the field

Failed to qualify

Source:

Final results
Saturday. July 15, 1939

Source:

Final eight bracket

Final match scorecards
Morning

Afternoon

Extra hole

Source:

References

External links
PGA Media Guide 2012
PGA.com – 1939 PGA Championship

PGA Championship
Golf in New York (state)
Sports competitions in New York City
Sports in Queens, New York
PGA Championship
PGA Championship
PGA Championship
PGA Championship
1930s in Queens
Flushing, Queens